Dahl's aquatic frog (Ranoidea dahlii) is a species of frog in the subfamily Pelodryadinae, endemic to Australia.  
Its natural habitats are dry savanna, subtropical or tropical dry lowland grassland, freshwater lakes, intermittent freshwater lakes, freshwater marshes, and intermittent freshwater marshes.

Dahl's aquatic frog was once thought to be able to consume the eggs, tadpoles, and young of the invasive and venomous cane toad with no apparent ill effect, but this observation was based on a handful of captive survivals. Adults regurgitate the young toads, and avoid eating them in the future, or rarely swallow them; in this case, about half the adults die. These frogs do not appear to have an elevated resistance to bufotoxins compared to other Australian hylid frogs, and avoid these toads if they survive their first toad meal.

See also

Gastric-brooding frog

References

Ranoidea (genus)
Amphibians of Western Australia
Amphibians of the Northern Territory
Amphibians of Queensland
Amphibians described in 1896
Taxonomy articles created by Polbot
Frogs of Australia
Taxobox binomials not recognized by IUCN